This is a list of intellectuals from the Age of Enlightenment.

See also
 Age of Enlightenment

References

1700s
Enlightenment philosophy
 
Lists related to the history of philosophy
Enlightenment
Secularism